The Room is the first EP released by Mexican rock band Zoé. This is the first release with their new record label Noiselab. The song "Dead" was promoted as a single and a music video was made by the direction of Dalai Vado.

The Room made it well into the Mexican sales chart and shipped over 50,000 copies.

Track listing
"Dead"
"She Comes"
"Morning Watts"
"Dead" (Los Dynamite Remix)
"Dead" (Lasser Drakar Remix)
"Dead" (Bengalamix)
"Dead" (Sub-Division Lasser Tears)
"Dead" (Sexy Lucy's Hell Flower Remix)

References

2005 debut EPs
Zoé albums
Rock en Español EPs